Experience is the debut album by German electronic act York. It features the hit singles Awakening, O.T.B. On The Beach, The Fields of Love (with ATB), and Farewell to The Moon.

Track listing

References

External links 
 , 

2001 debut albums
York (group) albums